The 33rd Infantry Brigade was an infantry brigade of the British Army that saw active service in the First World War and home service during the Second World War.

First World War
The 33rd Brigade was formed in the Great War in August 1914 as part of Kitchener's Army, initially made up of volunteer service battalions from a variety of different infantry regiments. For the duration of the war, the brigade was in the 11th (Northern) Division. Between February and September 1917 it was under the command of Brigadier-General Arthur Daly. From September 1917 to the end of the war it was commanded by Brigadier-General Frederick Spring. The brigade served in the Gallipoli Campaign, in Egypt and on the Western Front, and comprised the following units:

Order of battle
The brigade was composed as follows:
 6th (Service) Battalion, Lincolnshire Regiment
 6th (Service) Battalion, Border Regiment (disbanded 9 February 1918)
 7th (Service) Battalion, South Staffordshire Regiment
 9th (Service) Battalion, Sherwood Foresters
 33rd Machine Gun Company, Machine Gun Corps (formed March 1916, moved into 11th Battalion, Machine Gun Corps 28 February 1918)
 33rd Trench Mortar Battery (joined July 1917)

Actions
The brigade took part in the following actions:

Gallipoli campaign
1915
Battle of Suvla
 Landing at Suvla Bay, 6–15 August
 Battle of Scimitar Hill, 21 August
 Attack on 'W' Hills, 21 August
 Evacuation of Suvla, night 19/20 December

Western Front
1916
 Battle of the Somme
 Battle of Flers–Courcelette, 15–22 September
 Battle of Thiepval Ridge, 26–28 September

1917
 Operations on the Aisne, 11–19 January
 Battle of Messines, 9–14 June
 Third Battle of Ypres
 Battle of Langemarck, 16–18 August
 Fighting around St Julien, 19, 22 & 27 August
 Battle of Polygon Wood, 26 September–3 October
 Battle of Broodseinde, 4 October
 Battle of Poelcappelle, 9 October

1918
 Second Battle of Arras
 Battle of the Scarpe, 30 August
 Battle of the Drocourt-Quéant Line, 2–3 September
 Battles of the Hindenburg Line
 Battle of the Canal du Nord, 27 September–1 October
 Battle of Cambrai, 8–9 September
 Pursuit to the Selle, 9–12 October
 The Final Advance in Picardy
 Battle of the Sambre, 4 November
 Passage of the Grande Honnelle, 5–7 November

Second World War
The brigade was reformed on 24 October 1941 during the Second World War as 33rd Infantry Brigade. On 10 November 1942 it was redesignated the 33rd Independent Infantry Brigade (Guards), as an all-arms brigade group under the command of Brigadier J. Jefferson. It was part of London District. The brigade was intended for home defence in the event of a German invasion and never left the United Kingdom. It was disbanded on 6 October 1943.

Order of battle
The following units constituted the brigade:
 6th Battalion, Coldstream Guards (from 30 October 1941 to 30 September 1943)
 3rd Battalion, Irish Guards (from 30 October to 4 September 1943)
 3rd Battalion, Welsh Guards (from 30 October 1941 to 4 February 1942)
 11th Battalion, Worcestershire Regiment (from 5 to 31 December 1942; redesignated 1st Bn to replace battalion captured at the Fall of Tobruk)
 1st Battalion, Worcestershire Regiment (from 1 January to 4 October 1943)
 9th Battalion, Bedfordshire and Hertfordshire Regiment (from 1 January to 4 October 1943)
 177th Field Regiment, Royal Artillery (from 10 November 1942 to 4 October 1943)
 220th Anti-Tank Battery, Royal Artillery (from 10 November 1942 to 30 September 1943)
 80th Light Anti-Aircraft Battery, Royal Artillery (from 7 December 1942 to 12 September 1943)
 26th Field Company, Royal Engineers (from 10 November 1942 to 27 September 1943)
 24th Independent Reconnaissance Squadron, Reconnaissance Corps (from 10 November 1942 to 9 February 1943)
 33rd Independent Bde Gp (Gds) Company, Royal Army Service Corps:
 339 Company RASC (from 10 November 1942 to 24 April 1943)
 538 Company RASC (from 12 June to 4 October 1943)
 33rd Independent Bde Gp (Gds) Workshop, Royal Electrical and Mechanical Engineers (from 25 January to 30 September 1943)
 33rd Independent Bde Gp (Gds) Provost Section Corps of Military Police (from 7 December 1942 to 4 October 1943)

Notes

References
 A.F. Becke,History of the Great War: Order of Battle of Divisions, Part 3a: New Army Divisions (9–26), London: HM Stationery Office, 1938/Uckfield: Naval & Military Press, 2007, ISBN 1-847347-41-X.
 J.B.M. Frederick, Lineage Book of British Land Forces 1660–1978, Vol I, Wakefield: Microform Academic, 1984, ISBN 1-85117-007-3.
 
 F. G. Spring, The History of the 6th (Service) Battalion, Lincolnshire Regiment, Poacher Books, 2008.
 A. Turner, Messines 1917: The Zenith of Siege Warfare, Osprey Publishing, 2010.

External sources
 Chris Baker, The Long, Long Trail
 Imperial War Museum, '33rd Independent Infantry Brigade (Guards)'
 11th Battalion Worcestershire Regiment - 1940-1942 (The Worcestershire Regiment online)

Infantry brigades of the British Army in World War I
Infantry brigades of the British Army in World War II
Military units and formations established in 1914
Military units and formations disestablished in 1919
Military units and formations established in 1941
Military units and formations disestablished in 1943